Funtana is a village and municipality (2006) in Istria, Croatia, located between Poreč and Vrsar.

References

External links 
 Official Website
 Funtana Tourist Board Website

Municipalities of Croatia
Populated places in Istria County
Italian-speaking territorial units in Croatia